The King Kong grosbeak or giant grosbeak (Chloridops regiskongi) is a prehistoric species of Hawaiian honeycreeper, that was endemic to Hawaii. It had the largest beak of the three Chloridops species known to have existed. The King Kong grosbeak was described from fossils found at Barber's Point and Ulupau Head on the island of Oahu. The osteology of the mandible strongly suggests that C. regiskongi was a sister-taxon of Rhodacanthis.

The unusual name given to the species came from a reporter's misquoting of ornithologist Storrs L. Olson’s discovery of the then-unnamed species as being "a giant, gargantuan, King Kong finch."

References

Chloridops
Endemic fauna of Hawaii
Extinct birds of Hawaii
Hawaiian honeycreepers
Late Quaternary prehistoric birds
Quaternary birds of Oceania
Holocene extinctions
Birds described in 1991
Fossil taxa described in 1991
Taxa named by Helen F. James